Ivan Emilianov (born 19 February 1977) is a Moldovan shot putter.

He competed at the Olympic Games in 2000, 2004 and 2008, the World Championships in 2001 and 2007, the World Indoor Championships in 2004 and 2008 and the European Championships in 2002 and 2006 without reaching the finals.

He achieved his best throw of 20.64 metres on May 29, 2011 at the Moldovan Championships in Chişinău, Moldova.
He has 20.26 metres on the indoor track, achieved in February 2000 in Chişinău. He improved his own Moldovan national record in the shot put at an indoor meet in  Moldova in February, launching the implement 20.31 m.

Doping case
On 18 June 2011, he was banned from competition for 2 years for the use of banned anabolic steroids, metenolone and stanozolol.

References

External links
 

1977 births
Living people
Moldovan male shot putters
Athletes (track and field) at the 2000 Summer Olympics
Athletes (track and field) at the 2004 Summer Olympics
Athletes (track and field) at the 2008 Summer Olympics
Athletes (track and field) at the 2016 Summer Olympics
Olympic athletes of Moldova
World Athletics Championships athletes for Moldova
Sportspeople from Chișinău
Doping cases in athletics
Athletes (track and field) at the 2015 European Games
European Games competitors for Moldova
20th-century Moldovan people
21st-century Moldovan people